The Eisenhower Medical Center (EMC) is a not-for-profit hospital based in Rancho Mirage, California, serving the Coachella Valley region of Southeastern California. It was named one of the top one hundred hospitals in the United States in 2005.

History

Named for President Dwight D. Eisenhower, the hospital credits its initial creation to two events in 1966 when entertainer Bob Hope was asked to lend his name to a charity golf tournament and to serve on the board of the hospital that would be built from the tournament's proceeds. The original  of land were donated by Bob and Dolores Hope and both helped raise private funds for the hospital's construction. Construction began in 1969; the groundbreaking ceremony was attended by President Richard Nixon, Vice President Spiro Agnew, Governor Ronald Reagan, and entertainers Bob Hope, Frank Sinatra, Bing Crosby, Gene Autry, and Lucille Ball. The main Eisenhower hospital, designed by Edward Durrell Stone, opened in November 1971, containing 289 beds. Among the early trustees were actress Martha Hyer (the wife of film producer Hal B. Wallis) and Roy W Hill.

The three original medical buildings were named for local philanthropists Mr. and Mrs. Walter Probst, Mr. and Mrs. Peter Kiewit and Mrs. Hazel Wright. Philanthropists Walter and Leonore Annenberg donated funds to establish the Annenberg Center for Health Sciences.  A $212.5 million, four story addition to the hospital, the Walter and Leonore Annenberg Pavilion, opened for patient care in November 2010. Lee Annenberg donated over $100 million to Campaign Eisenhower, Phase II. Other institutions on the campus include the Barbara Sinatra Children's Center and the Dolores Hope Outpatient Care Center. Dolores Hope served in the capacities of President, Chairman of the Board and Chairman Emeritus since 1968 and participated in every major decision regarding the hospital until her death in 2011.

By 1990, the hospital's 3000th open heart surgical procedure was performed. In 2019, the hospital was recognized as one of the top five in the Riverside County-San Bernardino metro area.

Figures from the entertainment industry have been involved with fundraising for the hospital during its history; as the area is home to many from the entertainment industry, those notable figures have also received care at the hospital. In January 2006 President Gerald Ford was admitted to EMC for sixteen days for treatment of pneumonia.  Upon Ford's death on December 26, 2006 his body was taken to Eisenhower Medical Center, where his wife, Betty Ford, died in 2011.

References

External links
 Eisenhower Medical Center

Hospital buildings completed in 1971
Hospitals in Riverside County, California
1971 establishments in California
Charities based in California
Rancho Mirage, California